Yanis Sahraoui (born 16 September 1988)
is a French pop musician and singer-songwriter.

Yanis (who uses gender-neutral pronouns since 2021) debuted in the late 2000s under the stage name Sliimy (pronounced "Slimmy") through social networking websites where they released their songs. The artist soon received attention online and signed into recording label Warner Music Group, releasing the single Wake Up and their debut album Paint Your Face in 2009, which reached number 2 in the French charts. The singer then performed on stage, in concerts and in opening acts for Britney Spears and Katy Perry.

The artist, singing mostly in English with an accent that has been described as "mockney", with androgynous looks and a falsetto voice, was compared to Mika or Prince by the press. They were sometimes also dubbed "the French Mika" in their native France and internationally.

In 2015, the singer began performing as Yanis, and released the EP L'heure Bleue in 2016.

Life and career

Early life
Yanis Sahraoui was born on 16 September 1988 in Saint-Étienne, Loire. Of Moroccan and Algerian descent, Yanis grew up in the neighborhood of Vivaraize, along with their three sisters and brother. Yanis studied at high school before going to the university of Notre-Dame Valbernoîte.

In 2005, Yanis won a singing contest at Pax in Saint-Etienne, and won a record in a studio where Yanis met Etienne Feed, who became their partner and guitarist.

Debut as Sliimy (2007-2010)
In their late teens, Yanis began using the online alias "Sliimy": from the English word "slim", referring the artist's slender frame and a double I, which according to Yanis, visually represent two thin legs. As Sliimy, the singer used social networking websites such as Myspace where they uploaded recordings of their songs. The artist was met with success online, and with their guitarist they eventually signed into recording label Warner Music Group. The singer received more international attention in late 2008 after their cover of Britney Spears's song Womanizer was featured by American blogger Perez Hilton.

Sliimy's debut album  Paint Your Face was recorded at the artist's home studio in Saint-Étienne in January 2009. In February 2009, Yanis was part of the coming-nexts du Grand Journal in Canal+. Their first single was titled Wake Up and made available on legal music download platforms. Paint Your Face was mixed at Trout Recording Studio in New York in March by Bryce Goggin, who has worked with Antony and the Johnsons and Pavement. It was released on 6 April 2009 by Warner.

As "Sliimy", they opened for Britney Spears's Circus Tour in Paris-Bercy in France in July 2009.

In addition to having been the first part of Britney Spears's tour, Sliimy also went on tour with singer Katy Perry for the Hello Katy Tour in Switzerland and England in 2009. A few months later, the artist made a surprising appearance in the music video for the hit song I Gotta Feeling by The Black Eyed Peas in the album The END.

Four singles were taken from Paint Your Face between 2009 and 2010: Wake Up, Trust Me, the song Paint Your Face, and the double-single Our Generation/I See U Again.

In January 2010, the singer was nominated for the European Border Breakers Awards 2010 to represent France with Paint Your Face. The artist lost to Milow.

L'heure Bleue (2011-2016)

After their debut, in the year 2011 Sliimy announced that they will start to prepare and write the lyrics for their second studio album and that they easily chose to take time to refine their new album. In fact, the singer also claims to have written French records, unlike the first album and their primary ideas. On 9 September 2011, Sliimy gave an interview for the international fashion magazine Vs., in which they talk about their future projects and mainly expresses their desire to record a new album that will be "very different" than Paint Your Face, and show a clear evolution in their career. At the same time, a new demo leaked on the internet, the song Spellbound Kisses. A few months later in December 2011, other demos continued to be released, titled Polaroid and The Sky.

In March 2012, the artist revealed a re-adaptation of the song Skinny Genes by Eliza Doolittle in French. In September 2012, demos similar to the first two were released, titled Fight For Your Eyes and Light. In 2012 and 2013, the singer was regularly in the in-house studios of Warner Music in France.

In January 2013, the artist said they still has not decided on a release date, although the record could be out in 2014, and the themes and inspirations that will be addressed in this album will be the dream world and surrealism.

In spring 2015, the artist made a comeback as "Yanis" with a new single Hypnotized. The song was illustrated with a music video directed by Ludovic Zuili, which stars multiple people (including actress Charlotte Le Bon) performing dance moves; a disclaimer at the beginning alleges that "every single dance move [...] happened under a state of hypnosis". Later that year, the song was followed by another single Crave before releasing an EP titled  in February 2016.

Recent endeavors (2018-present)

In 2018, Yanis released a new song Embrace accompanied with a music video co-directed with Ludovic Zuili and Yanis. This was followed in 2020, when the artist released two songs titled Grace and You Boy.

In 2021, Yanis announced they prepared a new EP, and released the single Solo, sung in French.

Personal life

Yanis identifies as non-binary and uses gender-neutral pronouns since 2021.

When Yanis was 20, three days before the release of their debut album, Yanis (then publicly known as male) came out as gay to the media: "I have no problem saying that I’m gay. I know it and I am not afraid to hide it." When questions about this subject recur, Yanis responded that they like to play with different sexualities and ambiguity. In an interview, according to VS. magazine, Yanis insisted that music "transcended sexuality." "I don’t understand why people need to know what happens in my bedroom?!"

On 16 September 2021, while preparing the release of their new EP Solo, Yanis publicly came out as transgender and non-binary.

Discography

Albums 
Paint Your Face (2009) (as Sliimy)

EPs 
L'heure Bleue (2016)

Singles

As Sliimy 
Wake Up (2008)
Paint Your Face (2009)

As Yanis 
Hypnotized (2015)
Crave (2015)
Embrace (2018)
Grace (2020)
You Boy (2020)
Solo (2021)

References

1988 births
English-language singers from France
French pop singers
French people of Algerian descent
French people of Moroccan descent
French LGBT singers
French non-binary people
Non-binary singers
Living people
21st-century French singers
20th-century French LGBT people
21st-century French LGBT people